Kossandji is a village in south-eastern Ivory Coast. It is in the sub-prefecture of Danguira, Alépé Department, La Mé Region, Lagunes District.

Kossandji was a commune until March 2012, when it became one of 1126 communes nationwide that were abolished. The Mabi/Yaya Classified Forest is to the west, north, and east of the village.

Notes

Former communes of Ivory Coast
Populated places in Lagunes District
Populated places in La Mé